Major General Mohammed Zaman Kiani (1 October 1910 – 4 June 1981) was an officer of the British Indian Army who later joined the Indian National Army (INA), led by Subhas Chandra Bose, and commanded its 1st Division. He earned the Sword of Honour from the Indian Military Academy, and joined 14/1 Punjab Regiment (now 5 Punjab, in the Pakistan Army).

After Indian independence, Kiani moved to Pakistan, he served as political agent of Gilgit Agency and also remained Minister of Information in Muhammad Zia-ul-Haq's government. His contributions to the Azad Hind were later acknowledged and he was awarded with Netaji Medal posthumously by the Indian Government.

Early life 
Mohammad Zaman Kiani was born in the village of Shakarparian in the Rawalpindi District, now part of Islamabad, Pakistan.

A keen hockey player in his youth, Kiani joined the British Indian Army in 1931 at the Indian Military Academy at Dehra Dun. He won the Sword of Honour & Gold Medal for the most outstanding Cadet in 1935 from the Indian Military Academy, and was commissioned in the 1st Battalion 14th Punjab Regiment as a Second Lieutenant.

Second World War and the Azad Hind 
In March 1941 the 1st Battalion 14th Punjab Regiment was sent to Malaya and he fought in the Battle of Malaya during World War II and was taken prisoner of war. He later joined the First Indian National Army (INA), when it was formed in 1942 under the command of Mohan Singh. After this army collapsed due to disagreements with the Japanese, the Indian Independence League placed Kiani as Army Commander of the remains, with Jaganath Rao Bhonsle as Director of the Military Bureau.

After the arrival of Subhas Chandra Bose in 1943 and the revival of the Indian National Army (INA), as well as the proclamation of the Free India government, Kiani was appointed the commander of the first division, which he led during the invasion of India in 1944. At the time of the fall of Rangoon, Kiani led the personnel of the Indian National Army and the Azad Hind Government who, along with Bose, marched to Bangkok. After Bose flew to Tokyo in August 1945, Kiani surrendered to the British 5th Division at Singapore on 25 August 1945 as the commander of the INA, along with the rest of his troops. He was repatriated to India and interned until 1946, before being cashiered and discharged from the British Indian Army.

Poonch Rebellion 

Following the Partition of India, Kiani returned to Rawalpindi after the independence of Pakistan in 1947.

In September 1947, the Pakistani prime minister Liaquat Ali Khan and the Punjabi minister Shaukat Hayat Khan put him in charge of the southern wing of the Pakistan's effort to overthrow the Maharaja of Jammu and Kashmir. General Kiani established a General Headquarters, GHQ Azad, based in Gujrat City. From here, Kiani's forces organised raiding operations on Kashmir border and directed the Kashmiri rebels in Poonch, eventually leading to the formation of Azad Kashmir. Brigadier Habibur Rehman served as his chief of staff.

Later life 
Kiani was later appointed the political agent of the Government of Pakistan at Gilgit. He wrote his memoirs while in retirement in Rawalpindi. They were published after his death:

References

Sources

External links 
 Extract from Sugata Bose, A Hundred Horizons, world-journal.net, archived on 6 October 2007.

Indian National Army personnel
20th-century Indian Muslims
Azad Hind
British Indian Army officers
People from Karachi
Indian Military Academy alumni
1910 births
1981 deaths
People of the Indo-Pakistani War of 1947
People of the 1947 Kashmir conflict